Gulfport is a city in Pinellas County, Florida, United States, bordering St. Petersburg, South Pasadena, and Boca Ciega Bay. The population of Gulfport was 12,029 at the 2010 census. Gulfport is part of the Tampa–St. Petersburg–Clearwater metropolitan statistical area.

History
Archaeological digs around Boca Ciega Bay indicate that settlements existed in the area circa 3000 to 8000 BC. The area was also densely populated during the Safety Harbor period. In 1528, the Spanish explorer Pánfilo de Narváez landed on the Pinellas peninsula, some say near present-day Gulfport, where he encountered the local Timucuan peoples.
 
Gulfport has been known by several names since its founding. The first settler in what would become Gulfport were James and Rebecca Barnett in 1868 and named the area Barnett's Bluff. As other settlers trickled in and homesteaded the area, the settlement became known as Bonifacio around 1880. In 1884 Philadelphia financier Hamilton Disston envisioned a thriving port town that he called Disston City. However, the United States Postal Service would not recognize the name as it conflicted with a town in Hillsborough County, and the name Bonifacio was retained. Once that community folded in 1890, the Post Office allowed Bonifacio to be renamed as Disston City. In 1905, the town name was changed to Veteran City to reflect John Chase's vision for a retirement community of Civil War veterans. On October 12, 1910 the name changed officially to Gulfport when it got incorporated at the Gulf Casino located on the dock of Electric Railroad Company.

On April 1, 1886, a man named W. J. McPherson, who had moved to Disston City from Deland the previous year, published The Sea Breeze, which was the first newspaper for the lower Pinellas Peninsula. With a population of about 150 people, Disston City was the largest settlement on the lower peninsula in the 1880s.

During the first two decades of the 20th century, there was a considerable leftist movement in Florida. This included Gulfport electing E. E. Wintersgill, a Socialist mayor, in 1910 and having four Socialists to one Democrat sitting on the town's council. 

Gulfport was a sundown town into the 1950s. An informal policy prohibited African Americans from staying within town limits after sundown.

Geography

Demographics

According to the 2020 United States census, Gulfport had a population of 11,783 with 6,263 households. There were 1.87 persons per household and 87.7% lived in the same house as 1 year prior. The population per square mile was 4,255.3 

84.0% of the population was white, 6.4% was black or African American, 1.9% was Asian, 6.9% were two or more races, and 5.4% were Hispanic or Latino. There were 998 veterans in the city and 8.7% of the population were foreign born.

The median value of owner-occupied housing units was $252,500. The median selected monthly owner costs with a mortgage was $1,564. The median selected monthly owner costs without a mortgage was $573. The median gross rent was $1,211. The median household income was $56,896 and the per capita income was $42,374. 12,9% of the population lived behold the poverty threshold. 

96.6% of the households had a computer and 89.5% had a broadband internet subscription. 95.4% of the population over the age of 25 had a highschool degree or higher. 42.5% of that same population had a Bachelor's degree or higher.

Media 
GTV640 is the local Government-access television (GATV) cable TV channel for Gulfport. The signal was moved to channel 640 on February 9, 2015, on Bright House Networks. The municipal government broadcasts live meetings and replays on Brighthouse Cable Channel 640, as well as Live Streaming Video on the internet.

The channel includes city information, information relating to the city's events, a historical video of the city, city meetings, as well as additional programming.

Education 
Public education is provided by Pinellas County Schools. Gulfport has two public schools, Boca Ciega High School and Gulfport Elementary School. The closest middle school to Gulfport is Thurgood Marshall Fundamental Middle School, located in St. Petersburg.

Gulfport Elementary was the first Montessori school in Pinellas County.

The Gulfport Public Library is located on Beach Boulevard, not far from the Gulfport Multi-Purpose Senior Center and the Catherine Hickman Theater. It is a member of the Pinellas Public Library Cooperative, which facilitates inter-library borrowing of materials in the county.

Stetson University College of Law, founded in 1900, is located in Gulfport (having moved there in 1954 from its original location in DeLand). Its tower is one of the better-known images to locals and has become an iconic part of the skyline.

St. Petersburg College, a state college, has multiple campuses in the county and is available for those who aspire to a college degree. In addition, the city of St. Petersburg has a campus of the University of South Florida.

Culture

Gulfport has a free trolley bus that passengers can use to ride around the city and the surrounding area.

The downtown area has a few art galleries as well as the Catherine A. Hickman Theater, a small performing arts center. A celebration the first Friday and third Saturday of each month called Art Walk attracts locals and tourists. Many street performers, artists, and craftspeople show up to create a relaxed cultured atmosphere in the warm balmy evening breezes coming off the beach at the end of the street.

The Gulfport Community Players present several plays each year at the Hickman Theater. Also, the Catherine A. Hickman Theater of Gulfport is located on Beach Boulevard at 26th Avenue South and is a venue for live theatrical performances. The Gulfport Senior Center offers activities throughout the week for residents within and outside of the city limits.

The Gulfport Casino Ballroom, located on the waterfront, is one of the main event venues in the city. The Casino hosts Swing, Latin, Argentine Tango, and Ballroom Dance events five days a week with a large turnout from all across the Tampa area. The venue is available for rent to the public and is popular for weddings, company functions, and holiday parties. The ballroom features a  authentic 1930s style dance floor.

In 2011 Gulfport was named a finalist by Rand McNally for one of the best food towns in the United States.

Recreation
The city owns a full-service marina adjacent to Clam Bayou Nature Park.

Gulfport's Police Department includes a marine patrol which is responsible for the open waterway between Gulfport, St. Pete Beach, the Maximo neighborhood in St. Pete, and the Pinellas Bayway. They also patrol  of coastline along the Boca Ciega Bay.

There is a long municipal fishing pier, called Williams Pier, on Boca Ciega Bay. It's near the Casino Ballroom and not far from two Gulfport city parks, Veterans Park and the waterfront park and beach.

Gallery

References

External links 
 
Gulfport Area Chamber of Commerce

Cities in Pinellas County, Florida
Populated places on the Intracoastal Waterway in Florida
Cities in Florida
1884 establishments in Florida
Populated places established in 1884
Sundown towns in Florida